Ruth Catherine Grulkowski (December 9, 1930 – June 24, 2012) was a competitor in the gymnastics competition at the 1952 Summer Olympics in Helsinki.

Biography
Grulkowski was born on December 9, 1930 in Waumandee, Wisconsin. She moved to Chicago, Illinois, attended the University of Chicago. and married Robert Hatyina. She had three daughters (Cindy, Lisa, & Linda), and three grandchildren (Melissa, Bobby, & Carrie). Ruth died on June 24, 2012 due to medical complications.

Gymnastics
Grulkowski was part of the 1952 Women's Gymnastics Team. She later won the Amateur Athletic Union Women's National Championship Title in 1953 and 1954. She was a member of the Lincoln Turners, the Chicago Acro Theater, and the Adagio Gymnastics Group.

Olympic results

References

People from Buffalo County, Wisconsin
Sportspeople from Wisconsin
Olympic gymnasts of the United States
Gymnasts at the 1952 Summer Olympics
American female artistic gymnasts
1930 births
2012 deaths
21st-century American women